Tytan may refer to:
 Tytan (band), a British rock band of the early 1980s
 FC Tytan Donetsk, the Tytan soccer team from Donetsk, Ukraine
 FC Tytan Armyansk, the Tytan soccer team from Armyansk, Ukraine
 Projekt TYTAN, a Polish military future soldier system project
 TyTAN, a support program for the Eurofighter Typhoon

See also

 HTC TyTN, a smartphone
 Titan (disambiguation)